Beautiful Words is a play by the Australian playwright Sean Riley.

Plot
An epic chronicle of the refugee experience, Beautiful Words weaves together three very different stories of survival, told through the eyes of three children in different times and places. The outcome is heart-rending, humorous, and surprising by turns. From the horrors of Auschwitz Concentration Camp in the final days of World War II, to Taliban-ruled Kabul, to present day Australia, this enthralling play presents a rich tapestry of human experience, overlapping lives, and the bonds that unite generations.

First Production
Beautiful Words was first produced by Oddbodies Theatre Company, at Higher Ground, Adelaide, on 5 May 2006, with the following cast:

Kapo / Harry / Uncle Ramal:	Craig Behenna

Mrs Damrosch / Pearl / Stella:	Kim Liotta

Mama / Sheree / Ari’s Mother / Helen / Zaynab:	Eliza Lovell

Young Roman / Ari:	Tim Morgan

Old Roman / Alf:	Dennis Olsen

Toby / Jan / Trent:	Gabriel Partington

Viorica / Lurline / Mrs Greenberg:	Jacqy Phillips

Ion / Saul:	Stephen Sheehan

Papa / Victor / Ari’s Father / Technician:	Andreas Sobik

Director, Sean Riley

Designer, Dean Hills

Lighting Designer, Sue Grey-Gardner

Sound Designer, Angus MacDonald

References

Australian plays
2006 plays